The Winter's Tale is a 1967 British TV film based on The Winter's Tale by William Shakespeare. Directed by Frank Dunlop, it stars Laurence Harvey and Jane Asher. It was produced by Peter Snell and filmed in 1966. It was adapted from a popular stage production at the Edinburgh Festival which had a successful transfer to London.

The movie was distributed on the US college circuit in 1967. It got a cinema release in the UK in 1968.

Tom Baker, in an uncredited role, made his film debut in the film.

Cast
Laurence Harvey as King Leontes
Jane Asher as Perdita
Diana Churchill as Paulina
Moira Redmond as Hermione
Jim Dale as Autolycus
Esmond Knight as Camillo

References

External links

The Winter's Tale at British Lion
The Winter's Tale at BFI
Winter's Tale at Jane Asher

1967 films
British television films
Films based on The Winter's Tale
Bohemia in fiction
1960s English-language films